Inspector Nardone (Italian:Il commissario Nardone) is a 2012 Italian television miniseries. A crime series, it is based on the real-life figure Mario Nardone, a police officer who operated in 1950s Milan. It aired in twelve episodes on the Italian channel RAI.

Partial cast
 Sergio Assisi as  Mario Nardone 
 Samantha Michela Capitoni as Vanessa
 Franco Castellano as  Ossola 
 Sara D'Amario as Rina Fort 
 Luigi Di Fiore as Corrado Murano 
 Stefano Dionisi as Sergio Suderghi 
 Manlio Dovi as Salvatore Cangemi 
 Giampiero Judica as Checco Trapani 
 Anna Safroncik as Flò 
 Giuseppe Soleri as Luigi Bosso 
 Giorgia Surina as Eliana 
 Ludovico Vitrano as Peppino Rizzo  
 Francesco Zecca as Enrico Spitz  
 Igor Filipovic as Sani 
 Milan Cucilovic as  Curreri   
 Milena Pavlovic as  Pinuccia Somaschini

External links
 

2012 Italian television series debuts
2012 Italian television series endings
2010s Italian television series
RAI original programming